Juan Bautista Arístides Villanueva Chenaut was an Argentine politician and merchant who governed Mendoza Province during 1870 to 1873.

Biography 
Arístides Villanueva was born on August 11, 1825, in Mendoza, Argentina. He was son of José María Villanueva Pelliza and Juana Chenaut Moyano. Villanueva had a sister called Carolina. In 1844, Villanueva got married with Vicenta Doncel in San Juan city. He had two children: Guillermo and Vicenta Villanueva.

Political career 
He held various provincial and national political offices. He was War and Navy National Minister. He was also President of the Argentine Chamber of Deputies. Later he held the office of governor of Mendoza from November 20, 1870, to October 11, 1873. He succeeded his cousin Nicolás Villanueva, who had begun a period in Mendoza Province History known as "family governments".

Tributes 
Currently, a main avenue of Mendoza has his name. Due to the contribution to education, also an ancient school, located in the downtown, has it.

Notes 

Argentine politicians
People from Mendoza Province
People from Mendoza, Argentina
1825 births
1900 deaths